Owusu Benson or Benson Owusu (born 22 March 1977) is a retired Ghanaian football player.

Career 
He played in Switzerland since 1995, except one and a half year left for JEF United Ichihara Japan. He also holds a Swiss passport.

On Monday, 31 March 2008, he suffered a cardiac arrest during a training session. Owusu was successfully resuscitated and fell into coma, from which he recovered on 3 April 2008.

Benson played for SC Kriens club since 9 July 2004 and joined in January 2009 to SC Buochs.

Personal life
Benson is the father of the Swiss footballer Tyron Owusu.

Club statistics

National team statistics

References

External links

1977 births
Living people
Footballers from Accra
Ghanaian footballers
Ghanaian expatriate footballers
Ghana international footballers
Swiss men's footballers
Swiss Super League players
Swiss Challenge League players
FC Solothurn players
SC Kriens players
Yverdon-Sport FC players
FC Sportul Studențesc București players
FC Sion players
JEF United Chiba players
FC Wil players
SR Delémont players
Accra Hearts of Oak S.C. players
J1 League players
Liga I players
Expatriate footballers in Japan
Expatriate footballers in Romania
Association football midfielders
Ghanaian emigrants to Switzerland
Ghanaian expatriate sportspeople in Romania